Do Deuce (Japanese: ドウデュース, foaled 7 May 2019) is a Japanese Thoroughbred racehorse. He was the best two-year-old colt in Japan in 2021 when he was undefeated in three races including the Ivy Stakes and the Asahi Hai Futurity Stakes.

Background
Do Deuce is a bay colt with a white blaze bred in Japan by Northern Farm. During his racing career he was trained by Yasuo Tomomichi and raced in the grey and white of Kieffers Co Ltd.

He was from the twelfth crop of foals sired by Heart's Cry a horse whose wins included the Arima Kinen and the Dubai Sheema Classic, as well as the only racehorse that was able to defeat Japanese legendary racehorse Deep Impact on Japanese soil. His other foals have included Suave Richard, Admire Rakti, Just A Way and Lys Gracieux. Do Deuce's dam Dust And Diamonds was bred in Kentucky and raced with considerable success in the United States where she won the Gallant Bloom Handicap and ran second in the Breeders' Cup Filly & Mare Sprint. In November 2016 at Keeneland she was bought for $1,000,000 by Katsumi Yoshida and exported to Japan. She was a great-granddaughter of Darling Lady, a half-sister to the dams of Dancing Brave and Jolypha.

Racing career

2021: two-year-old season
Do Deuce began his racing career in a contest for previously unraced juveniles over 1800 metres on good to firm ground at Kokura Racecourse on 5 September 2021. Ridden by Yutaka Take he started the 0.7/1 favourite and won by a neck from Gaia Force. Take was again in the saddle when the colt was stepped up in class to contest the Listed Ivy Stakes over the same distance at Tokyo Racecourse in the following month. He started second choice in the betting and prevailed by a neck and three quarters of a length from Gran Cielo and Ask Victor More after taking the lead in the straight.

On 19 December at Hanshin Racecourse, Do Deuce was stepped up to Grade 1 class to contest Asahi Hai Futurity Stakes over 1600 metres and went off the 6.8/1 third choice in the betting behind Serifos (winner of the Niigata Nisai Stakes) and Geoglyph (Sapporo Nisai Stakes). Take positioned the colt on the outside in mid-division before producing a strong run down the centre of the straight. He got the better of a sustained struggle with Serifos in the last 200 metres to win by half a length. After the race Take, who was winning the race for the first time, said “Do Deuce is an honest colt. We were able to run in a good position and in good rhythm while observing the others. He responded well going into the straight and although the favorite was stubborn and hard to beat, he dug in remarkably all the way to the line. He’s getting stronger by every race—we can look forward to the spring classics next year."

In January 2021, at the JRA Awards, Do Deuce was named Best Two-Year-Old Colt, taking 251 of the 296 votes. In the official Japanese rankings Do Deuce was rated the best two-year-old of 2021, one pound ahead of Serifos and the Hopeful Stakes winner Killer Ability.

2022: three-year-old season
On his first run as a three-year-old, Do Deuce started favourite for the Grade 2 Yayoi Sho over 2000 metres at Nakayama Racecourse on 6 March. He tracked the leaders for most of the way and finished strongly but sustained his first defeat as he failed to run down Ask Victor More and was beaten a neck into second place. In the Satsuki Sho over the same course and distance on 17 April the colt started the 2.9/1 favourite in an eighteen-runner field but despite producing a strong late charge from the rear of the field he was unable to reel in the leaders and came home third behind Geoglyph and Equinox.

Do Deuce then went to France to run in the Prix Niel before running in the Prix de l'Arc de Triomphe. He finished fourth to Simca Mille for the Prix Niel and finished 19th against Alpinista for the l'Arc de Triomphe, which was the worst out of the four Japanese horses that ran that year.

After returning to Japan, it was announced that he would take the remainder of the year off before returning to the races at next year's Kyoto Kinen, with the Dubai Turf in mind.

2023: four-year-old season 
Do Deuce became the first Derby winner in 75 years to win the Kyoto Kinen, after he became the most favored to win.

Pedigree

Do Deuce in inbred 4 × 4 to Lyphard, meaning that this stallion appears twice in the fourth generation of his pedigree.

References

2019 racehorse births
Racehorses bred in Japan
Racehorses trained in Japan
Thoroughbred family 3-d